{{Infobox book series
| name       = How to Train Your Dragon
| books      = 
 How to Train Your Dragon
 How to Be a Pirate
 How to Speak Dragonese
 How to Cheat a Dragon's Curse
 How to Twist a Dragon's Tale
 A Hero's Guide to Deadly Dragons How to Ride a Dragon's Storm How to Break a Dragon's Heart How to Steal a Dragon's Sword How to Seize a Dragon's Jewel How to Betray a Dragon's Hero How to Fight a Dragon's Fury| image      = How to Train Your Dragon (2003 book cover).jpg
| caption    = Cover of the first edition of How to Train Your Dragon| author     = Cressida Cowell
| country    = United Kingdom
| language   = English
| genre      = Fantasy, young adult fiction, coming of age
| publisher  = 
| pub_date   = 2003–2015
| media_type = 
}}How to Train Your Dragon is a series of children's books written by British author Cressida Cowell. The books are set in a fictional Viking world, and focus on the experiences of protagonist Hiccup Horrendous Haddock the Third, as he overcomes obstacles on his journey of "becoming a hero, the hard way". The books were published by Hodder Children's Books in the UK and by Little, Brown and Company in the US. The first book was published in 2003 and the 12th and final one in 2015. By 2015, the series had sold more than seven million copies around the world. The books have subsequently been adapted into a media franchise consisting of three animated feature films, several television series and other media, all produced by DreamWorks Animation.

 Books 
Cowell has published twelve full novels, based around the adventures of a young Viking named Hiccup Horrendous Haddock the Third. The first book was published in 2003, and the last book was released in 2015. All the books have titles based around an instruction guide.

 Related books 
 How To Train Your Viking, by “Toothless the Dragon” (2006)
 The Day of the Dreader (2012)
 The Incomplete Book of Dragons: A Guide to Dragon Species (2014, UK) / The Complete Book of Dragons: A Guide to Dragon Species (2014, US)

 Related picture book 
 Hiccup: The Viking Who Was Seasick (2000, UK) / Hiccup: The Seasick Viking (2000, US), released on audio under the title How to Be a Viking Related early reader books 
DreamWorks also published 6 early reader books based on the movies; these were not written by Cressida Cowell. They are:

 How to Start a Dragon Academy How to Pick Your Dragon How to Raise Three Dragons How to Track a Dragon How to Defend Your Dragon How to Build a Dragon FortCowell published the supplementary spin-off stories as part of the series: The Day of the Dreader is a short story published in 2012 and the novella How to Train Your Viking was published as part of World Book Day 2006 and is claimed to be written by the dragon Toothless and translated by Cowell. Both of these titles were published in the US as part of the May 2014 How to Train Your Dragon Special Edition: With Brand New Short Stories! paperback movie tie-in edition. A picture book, Hiccup the Seasick Viking published in 2000, is not considered a part of the series despite featuring the same character of Hiccup. An illustrative guide to the dragon world, titled The Incomplete Book of Dragons, was released in June 2014 (in the US it is titled The Complete Book of Dragons).

Cowell cites the Scottish Inner Hebrides islands and stories of Scandinavian Scotland as inspirations for the book..

 Characters 
 Overview 
 A dark grey cell indicates that the character was not in the property or that the character's presence in the property has yet to be announced.
 A Main indicates a character had a starring role in the property.
 A Supporting indicates the character appeared in two or more times within the property.
 A Guest indicates the character appeared once in the property.

 Main 
 Hiccup Horrendous Haddock the Third (in books 1–12) is the protagonist of the books. He was thought to be useless and weak by everyone, including his own father. They did not understand his intellectual brilliance.  He is unusual for a Viking not only physically, being very thin with bright red hair, but also intellectually, as he thinks before he acts and is unusually clever. He is one of the only people ever to understand and be able to speak Dragonese, the language of the dragons. Hiccup was also a very good sword fighter (unique in that he was left-handed) and the best Viking Hero that ever lived. An intelligent and quiet boy, he was picked on the most by the bullies but shows them that he's a capable leader.
 Toothless (in books 1–12) is Hiccup's hunting-dragon who appears in all the story books. He appears to be a green Common-or-Garden Dragon, although Fishlegs spread a false story that he is a near extinct, more vicious relative of the Monstrous Nightmare breed called the Toothless Daydream and possibly the offspring of the mighty dragon ruler King Daggerfangs. He is one of the King's Lost Things. In book 11, it is revealed he is a young Seadragonus Giganticus Maximus.
 Fishlegs (in books 1–12) is Hiccup's best friend and supporting character in a number of books who is allergic to reptiles. He has a squint, asthma, his pet is the only vegetarian dragon on the planet, and he is seen as a wimp, but he has shown himself to be quite cunning when he needs to be. He is also fond of poetry and wants to be a bard in later books. He is not a Hooligan by blood but an orphan who washed up on Berk's shores as an infant, his parentage being a mystery to him until the identities of his mother and father were revealed to him in the tenth and twelfth books respectively. At the end of the final book, he founds his own tribe, the No-Names, and becomes a bard.
 Camicazi (in books 3–12) is a chatty, fierce and a deliberately confusing sword fighter from the tribe of female warriors known as the Bog-Burglars who is a supporting character in a number of books. She is very skilled at escapes and burglary. She is extremely proud of being a member of her tribe and she is also the heir to the tribe. In some ways, she is complementary to Hiccup, in that since she does not think very carefully about the situation, and just rushes in without thinking, so he pulls her back, and she, in return pushes him forward, convincing Hiccup to trust his instincts.
 Stoick the Vast (in books 1–12) is Hiccup's father and leader of the Hairy Hooligans, their tribe. Unlike his son, he is incredibly strong and beefy but rather unintelligent. However, he grows throughout the course of the books to become more open-minded and attempts to understand his son better. He owned two dragons, Newtsbreath and Hookfang. Hookfang is only mentioned in the first book and Newtsbreath appears for the last time in the second books. Stoick is said to have another dragon called Bullheart who appears exclusively in the ninth book.
 Snotface Snotlout (in books 1–11), is Hiccup's much-despised cousin. He bullies and bosses the others around, especially Fishlegs and Hiccup whom he addresses as "Hiccup the Useless and his fishlegged failure of a friend". He is top class at 'Bashyball', 'Advanced Rudery' and 'everything else'. His dragon is a brilliant scarlet Monstrous Nightmare named Fireworm, who because of her breed should technically belong to Hiccup (as the son of the Chief) according to ancient Viking law. He gets killed in an attack at the end of Book 11 in an attempt to help Hiccup become King of the Wilderwest. Later, Hiccup silently forgives Snotlout for the years of rivalry between them. Upon Hiccup informing the Vikings of his sacrifice, he is posthumously honored by the Vikings as a hero.
 Valhallarama (in books 1, 5, 10–12) is Hiccup's mother. She appears in only a few books, and is often away Questing. She once loved Humungously Hotshot the Hero and gave him a ruby heart necklace (which turns out to be one of the King's Lost Things). She reappears in Book 10 to help Hiccup become King of the Wilderwest.
 Gobber the Belch (in books 1–12) is the Viking in charge of the Viking Initiation Programme (later on the Pirate Training Programme) and is described in book 5 as "a six-and-a-half-foot ax-wielding lunatic who was not the kind of teacher you argued with". At the beginning of the first few books, he gives his lessons in extreme situations, such as a storm in book 2. In later books, he is an extremely loyal member of the Company of the Dragonmark (Hiccup's followers to become King of the Wilderwest).

 Vikings 
 Dogsbreath the Duhbrain (in books 1–10) is Snotlout's friend and sidekick bully.  He is usually seen following Snotlout's orders, usually the difficult and tedious jobs. He is not very intelligent and does not talk much. His dragon is a Gronckle named Seaslug.
 Mogadon the Meathead (in books 1, 2, 5, 9, 10 and 12) is Chief of the Meathead Tribe, close neighbors of the Hairy Hooligans.  A man with a fake leg and an eyepatch, he shares a sometimes vicious rivalry with Stoick.
 Thuggory the Meathead (in books 1, 9–12) is Mogadon's son, and very like Snotlout. Although he is large, muscular, well-respected and has a huge silver Monstrous Nightmare dragon called Killer, he stands up for Hiccup and works with him in the first book. Later, in Book 10, he becomes the first member of Hiccup's Company of the Dragonmark (excluding Valhallarama who founded it).
 Alvin the Treacherous (in books 2–3, 5, 8–12) is Hiccup's arch-enemy and rival to become King of the Wilderwest. He used to be Chief of the Outcast Tribe in book 2 and was again in books 9–12. He is the main antagonist in books 2–3, 5, and is joined by Excellinor the Witch (his mother) in books 8–12. Although he is a fantastic sword fighter, he is frequently losing parts of his body such as all of his hair, a hand, a foot, a nose, and an eye (as the results of his encounters with Hiccup), and becomes increasingly disfigured by warts (caught from his mother) across the final four books.  He is also Fishlegs' father by Termagant, as revealed by the final book. He is claimed by the Dragon Guardians.
Norbert the Nutjob (in books 4, 7, 12) is the Chief of the Hysterical Tribe, and Hiccup's second arch-enemy. Norbert's father, Bigjob, once went to America and retrieved a potato, but Hiccup took it to cure Fishlegs of Vorpentitis. As his name suggests, he is insane and uses his giant axe – one gold side and one black side – to decide everything. He appears in the last book disguised as a Wanderer, his survival never explained.
 Humungously Hotshot the Hero (in books 5, 8, 12) has been trapped on the island of Lava-Louts for 15 years. He went out on a quest to find the fire stone for Hiccup's grandfather, Old Wrinkly, so he could marry Hiccup's mother, Valhallarama. He failed, and after Valhallarama marries Stoick the Vast eventually marries Tantrum O'UGerly, the daughter of UG the Uglithug in book 8.
 Big-Boobied Bertha (in books 3–8, 11) is the leader of the Bog-Burglars and the mother of Camicazi. As her name indicates, she has very large breasts and it is mentioned that "these breasts have killed before and will kill again".
 Madguts the Murderous (in books 5–7, 9) is the Chief of the Murderous Tribe. A vicious, frightening, vile smelling man covered in skull tattoos and with "Hate" on the knuckles of both his hands, he is considered one of the scariest men in the Barbarian Archipelago.  He also never speaks (though he spoke to Mogadon the Meathead in the fifth book). He has a stealth dragon stolen from him by Bertha and intends to kill her, and later tries to legally kill Stoick and Bertha in the seventh book. Both times he is stopped by Hiccup. Camicazi supposedly burgles from him regularly.
 Excellinor (in books 8–12) is Alvin's witch of a mother. She is pure evil and wants Hiccup's sword.  It is said that she never took good care of Alvin the Treacherous and never loved him either. She was locked in a tree trunk for twenty years by UG the Uglithug. Her name was unknown until the ninth book. She is the cause of Alvin's warts and is covered in them. She uses Vampire Spydragons as spies for her. At the end of the final book, she falls into a deep blowhole in the ground and presumably dies there.
 Old Wrinkly (in books 1–5, 7–9, 11, 12), is Valhallarama's father and Hiccup's grandfather. Old Wrinkly is the soothsayer and doctor of the Hairy Hooligans tribe and only trusted thinker of the Tribe. Between the beginning of Book 9 and the end of Book 11, it is unknown what came of him. He appears in the twelfth and final book.

 Dragons 
 Horrorcow (in books 1–3, 5, 7, 9, 12) is Fishlegs's hunting dragon of the Basic Brown species. She is named 'Horror' for effect and 'Cow' because she is not dangerous and sleeps a lot. Fishlegs suspects she is a vegetarian. She is three times the size of Toothless and is his best dragon friend.  She spends much of the series clinging in fright to Fishlegs' head. When she climbs down from Fishleg's head during Book 9, she is not mentioned again until the end of the final book, explaining that she hated the violence of the war and so hid underground until it was all over.
 Fireworm (in books 1–3, 5, 8–9) is Snotlout's completely immodest and temperamental dragon. She is a red Monstrous Nightmare and immensely dislikes Toothless, often jeering in Dragonese, prodding and attacking him. She joins the Dragon Rebellion in Book 9.
 Stormfly (in books 6–12,) is Camicazi's dragon. Stormfly is a Mood-Dragon, allowing her to change color depending on her mood; when angry, she will turn blue-black, and when lying, she turns purple. Stormfly is unusual in that she speaks in Norse, but she is, as Fishlegs calls her, a pathological liar making it apparent when she is lying. Toothless develops a crush on Stormfly when he meets her for the first time and throughout the series, there are many scenes that involve the two dragons subtly flirting (Stormfly lies a lot in these conversations).
 Windwalker (in books 5, 8-12) is fiercely loyal to Hiccup, even through terrifying situations. His type of dragon enters a chrysalis stage. It is unknown what happens to them after that.
 Wodensfang (in books 9–12) is an ancient brown dragon, living from when Hiccup Horrendous Haddock I lived. He is a wise dragon, whom Hiccup the Third meets while getting the Crown. He is able to understand and speak (happens in the 11th book) Norse and helps Hiccup in his quest to stop the Rebellion. In the eleventh book, it is revealed that he is an extremely ancient Seadragonus Giganticus Maximus.
 Patience, Innocence and Arrogance (in books 10–12) is a triple-headed Deadly Shadow dragon. He can camouflage. He is an Air dragon.  He was Termagant's (Fishlegs' mother's) riding dragon, and he swore to look after Fishlegs when he was a baby and set out to sea. The two are reunited in book 10 and he officially becomes Fishlegs's dragon. The three heads have individual personalities.
 Furious (in books 8–12) is a Seadragonus Giganticus Maximus that started and is the leader of the Dragon Rebellion and continuously tries to chase down Hiccup. He was the Dragon-Brother of Hiccup Horrendous Haddock The Second, and becomes Hiccup Horrendous Haddock III's blood brother at the end of the final book, shortly before his death from the poisoned Stormblade sword, which Alvin's mother thrust into him. His death is what finalizes the peace between Vikings and dragons.

|-
|style="text-align: left;"|Notes:

 Synopsis 
 How to Train Your Dragon (2003) 
The first book in the series follows Hiccup as he captures a dragon as a rite of passage and attempts to train him so that he will not be exiled from Berk, as is its tradition for young Viking boys on this island. Led by their teacher, Gobber the Belch, Hiccup manages to catch a small dragon, whom he names Toothless, and attempts to train it through his own methods. The Viking students are told to read a book called 'How to Train Your Dragon' by Professor Yobbish, but the book was found to have only one page and was therefore unhelpful. The Viking students must have their dragons trained before the Thor'sday Thursday Celebration in order to become proper Vikings. During this celebration, Toothless offends another dragon and a fight ensues between all the dragons.  As this is seen as failure to train the dragons correctly, the boys are exiled, allowed to stay one night while a storm rages. During the storm, three Sea Dragons are washed up on the shore of the island and one seems a threat to the Vikings. Hiccup is chosen to negotiate with the dragon, who has eaten one of the other dragons. However, the dragon, who calls himself the Green Death, says he is going to kill all the Vikings. While the village elders argue over how to attack the Green Death, Hiccup, the boys and their dragons start a fight between the Green Death and the other sea dragon, the Purple Death, resulting in Hiccup nearly being swallowed and having to be rescued by Toothless, killing both sea dragons in the process. Hiccup and Toothless become heroes because of their bravery.

 How to Be A Pirate (2004) 
Hiccup finds the coffin of Grimbeard the Ghastly, the greatest pirate of all times and Hiccup's great-great-grandfather. The coffin contains a living man, named Alvin the Treacherous, who hides his true identity under the name Alvin the Poor-but-Honest-Farmer. Alvin tells the Hooligans that he was locked in the coffin and sent out to sea by "some very rude people". He claims that he found a riddle that tells how to find the treasure of Grimbeard the Ghastly and a map that depicts the island where the treasure is buried.

The Hooligans travel to the Isle of the Skullions, where they believe the treasure is hidden. Snotlout finds a small chest containing Grimbeard's famous sword, the Stormblade. Opening the chest triggers a trap which wakes up the Skullion dragons which inhabit the island. A brief fight with the Skullions ensues, a few of the Skullions are killed, and the Vikings escape with the treasure. Upon nearing Berk,  the Hooligans begin fighting over the treasure, and as they fight, they are ambushed by a group of cannibalistic Vikings known as the Outcasts. Alvin reveals himself to be the Outcast's chief, and another battle starts. The ship soon catches fire and sinks. Everyone abandons it, climbing on the Outcasts' ship to continue the battle, but Hiccup, Toothless, Fishlegs, and Alvin are trapped underneath the capsized ship, kept alive with an air pocket.

As the air pocket is finally destroyed by the weight of the capsized ship, Toothless finds an underwater cavern filled with air. As the party begins to explore the cavern they come to a door and upon opening it, they find the real treasure of Grimbeard the Ghastly. Alvin turns on Hiccup to kill him using the Stormblade. In the sword-fight that follows, Alvin is eaten by a Monstrous Strangulator, an octopus-like creature which guards the treasure. As it comes next for Hiccup, Hiccup tricks the creature into injecting itself with its own poison. The creature's nervous system is destroyed and they escape, but Hiccup decides that the world is not ready for the treasure, and leaves it behind.

 How to Speak Dragonese (2005) 
Hiccup and Fishlegs get lost while out at sea. Toothless is caught by Romans, while Hiccup hides and tries to figure out a way to free him and escape. Hiccup causes a distraction and escapes with Fishlegs, but not before losing half of his How to Speak Dragonese notebook. In the morning, Hiccup realizes he took home a Nanodragon from the Roman Ship. The Nanodragon is, in fact, the king of the Nanodragons and self-proclaimed 'living god', Ziggerastica. For saving his life, Ziggerastica tells Hiccup he can call his name and he will come.

During another lesson, Hiccup and Fishlegs are again kidnapped and taken to Fort Sinister, a base of operations for the Roman Empire. Once there, Hiccup recognizes his old enemy Alvin the Treacherous. Fishlegs and Hiccup are imprisoned along with the young female Bog-Burglar heir, Camicazi. Toothless is eventually allowed to stay with Hiccup. After several failed attempts at escape, Hiccup calls for Ziggerastica and comes up with a plan of escape on Saturn's Day.

When the festival day arrives, the gang are put on a ship and sail into the gladiatorial arena, where they are to fight deadly Sharkworms, rather than a traditional fight on land. However, due to Hiccup's planning with the nanodragon king, Hiccup appears to fly into the air like a God and 'blow' the cage roof off. The stunned Fat Consul gives him his Roman Shield, while Alvin the Treacherous gives Hiccup back his How to Speak Dragonese book. The arena erupts in chaos and the children escape in a Roman Observation Balloon. Alvin manages to get his hand-hook lodged into the balloon basket, but the children are able to twist him off, and he falls into Sharkworm-infested waters.
They fly home in the balloon, then crash land onto the ships of Stoick and Big-Boobied Bertha. The two tribes make amends and return to their homes. Unbeknownst to Hiccup, Alvin had planted a Venomous Vorpent within the pages of his book, and it stings someone.

 How to Cheat a Dragon's Curse (2006) 
During a hunting expedition, Hiccup and Fishlegs spot a group of Hysterics, a tribe of scary lunatic Vikings. Hiccup and Fishlegs flee, with the Hysterics behind in hot pursuit. They are saved by One-Eye, a Saber-Toothed Driver dragon. Fishlegs catches Vorpentitis, a disease caused by the sting of a Venomous Vorpent, and the only cure to this disease requires "the vegetable that no one dares name" (potato) from "the land that does not exist" (America). Old Wrinkly predicts the potato might be in the Hysteric Territories, and tells him that he must bring it back before ten o'clock the next morning, or else Fishlegs will die.

Hiccup brings Camicazi and Toothless on the journey to Hysteria, with One-Eye pulling them on a sleigh. The two children enter through the roof, but Hiccup falls into a pot of onion soup, and is discovered by Norbert the Nutjob. Hiccup makes Norbert show him the potato by pretending not to believe it exists. Norbert locks Hiccup in a cage. After the Hysterics fall asleep, Camicazi picks the lock of Hiccup's cage and they leave the Hall through the chimney. 

The three, along with One-eye, escape in Hiccup's boat, but get attacked by the Doomfang, which eats the potato. Hiccup realizes the Doomfang has Vorpentitis. Once he gets back, he realizes that Fishlegs had only caught a cold, and Old Wrinkly had made a mistake. Old Wrinkly examines Hiccup and explains that it is actually Hiccup who has Vorpentitis. Fishlegs shoots Hiccup on the foot with an arrow soaked in the juices of the potato, and Hiccup recovers. 

Hiccup plants the arrow in hopes of growing potatoes so no one dies of Vorpentitis ever again.

 How to Twist a Dragon's Tale (2007) 
While on a herding exercise, the children are distracted by a huge fire rolling down the mountainside. The fire is found to be the doing of evil fire dragons called Exterminators. While most of the kids escape on Gobber's riding dragon, Goliath, Hiccup and Gobber are saved by Humungously Hotshot, one of the greatest heroes on the planet. Hiccup's father, Stoick, hires him as Hiccup's bodyguard.

One night, Hiccup wakes up to Hotshot looming over him with his swords, arguing with himself whether or not to kill Hiccup. Hiccup asks him what he's doing. Hotshot begins to tell Hiccup his story of how he fell in love with a Viking woman, but her father wanted her to marry someone clever. The woman's father sent Hotshot to find and bring back the Firestone, and the reward was the woman's hand in marriage. Hotshot traveled to the volcano where the Firestone was hidden, but was captured by the Lava Louts. After a few weeks, he became friends with a jailkeeper named Terrific Al. Al told Humongous that he would bring the ruby heart to his ladylove if he killed Hiccup, stating that Hiccup is a Devil Child, who will send terror across the Archipelago. 

Hiccup figures out that the woman is Hiccup's own mother and "Terrific Al" is really Alvin the Treacherous. Hiccup, his friends, and their dragons travel to Lava-Lout Island to put the fire stone inside the volcano to stop the volcano from exploding. They are attacked by Alvin riding an Exterminator. Hiccup puts the stone into the volcano and the stone hatches into a fire dragon. The dragon eats Alvin and the Exterminators and dives back into the lava. Hiccup and his riding dragon, Windwalker, run down the island away from lava and fall into the sea. Hiccup's father and others rescue him and everything works out well.

 A Hero's Guide To Deadly Dragons (2007) 
On his birthday, Hiccup goes to the Finals of a Burglary Competition between the Bog-Burglars and the Hooligans. When Hiccup returns home, he realizes Toothless has eaten three-quarters of Stoick's throne. Stoick comes in the room in a bad temper. He throws a tantrum, but remembers that Gobber has stolen the "How to Train Your Dragon" manual from the Library. Stoick tells Hiccup that if Toothless does one more thing like this, he will banish him, and goes off to find the book. Toothless guiltily reveals that he also burned the copy of "How To Train Your Dragon". Camicazi suggests that the library might have another copy of the book. 

Hiccup, Camicazi and Fishlegs go to the Island of Forget Me to visit the Meathead Public Library. They fly on a Stealth Dragon which had been stolen from the Murderous Tribe. With the help of Stormfly, Camicazi's dragon, they find a second edition of "How to Train Your Dragon". The Hairy Scary Librarian catches them stealing the book and fights with Camicazi and Hiccup. The noise attracts Driller Dragons who are dwelling in the Library. Hiccup finds a book that was written by Hiccup Horrendous Haddock II called A Hero's Guide To Deadly Dragons which was exactly the same book that had been taken from him earlier that morning. He pulls the book out and the library shelf opens, revealing a hole filled with Poisonous Piffleworms. Their only exit would be to go through the hole.

Hiccup takes back the second edition of How to Train Your Dragon to the Isle of Berk. The Hairy Scary Librarian arrives and shoots Stoick with a Northbow, but Hiccup's handwritten book saves Stoick's life. Hiccup, Fishlegs, and Camicazi come from the sky and squash the Librarian flat with the Stealth Dragon. Madguts the Murderous, Chief of the Murderous Tribe, arrives for the Stealth Dragon and are about to kill Big-Boobied Bertha, who stole the dragon. Hiccup saves her by telling Madguts that the Scary Hairy Librarian stole the Stealth Dragon instead. Madguts believes him and takes the Librarian away. Hiccup persuades Stoick that books are useful and books are unbanned by order of the Thing.

 How to Ride a Dragon's Storm (2008) 
Madguts the Murderous invites the Bog-burglars and the Hairy Hooligans to join the Murderous Tribe for an Intertribal Friendly Swimming race. The winner, to be defined as the last person back, may have a single request granted by the three Chiefs. Madguts, Stoick and Big Boobied Bertha set off to the water more slowly than the others, more certain that they will win the race. During the race, Hiccup, Camicazi and Fishlegs are taken to a ship, along with their hunting dragons. On the ship are Madguts, Norbert the Nutjob, and Gumboil. Norbert has asked Madguts to take Hiccup, Camicazi and Fishlegs to the boat in order to get them out of the race.

Hiccup discovers there are slaves called the Northern Wanderers on the boat. Hiccup escapes with the Wanderers. After all Wanderers are safe on the emergency boats, Hiccup falls off the boat and lands on an iceberg, and is chased into a cave, where he wakes up a Leviathorgan. Hiccup gets back onto the boat as a storm breaks out, and the Leviathorgan attacks the ship. Norbert and Hiccup fight on the top of the ship. Lightning strikes Norbert's axe and it enters the sea, killing the Leviathorgan. Hiccup falls off the mast and is rescued by Fishlegs and Camicazi, who are themselves rescued by the Wanderers. The three fly to Berk on Norbert's flying machine, which the Wanderers had collected. The machine works well, but as they near Berk, the machine breaks and crashes into the ocean. Hiccup and his friends come just in time. Because Hiccup is the last person back, he demands Madguts to sing a love song at the next "Thing" while dressed up as an "ickle pretty shepherdess".

It is revealed that in turn for his life, the Northern Wanderers have tattooed Hiccup with the Slavemark, a Viking symbol which now means he is technically a slave. However, he can hide the Slavemark under his helmet and so now will have to wear his helmet forever.

 How to Break a Dragon's Heart (2009) 
Camicazi has been shipwrecked during a storm and the Hooligans are searching for her. They end up shipwrecked on a haunted beach belonging to wicked pirates called Uglithugs. While on the beach, they find a mysterious object, and they discover it is a throne belonging to Hooligans. In the middle of the night, the leader of the Uglithugs, UG, and his men, discover the Hooligans, waking them up. UG tells them that a Hooligan has been sending love letters to his daughter, Tantrum O'Ugerly, and explains that if the person is of royal blood, the person can ask for Tantrum's hand in marriage after the person finishes an Impossible Task. If not, the person will be killed. Hiccup realizes that Fishlegs is the one who sent the letters, and spares Fishlegs's life by telling UG that he himself wrote the letters. UG then tells him the Impossible Task: by 5:00 the next day, he must give them a barrel of mead made from the honey made by the bees on the Island of Berserk.

On Berserk, Fishlegs successfully collects five pots of honey, but he and Hiccup are captured by Berserks. At the Berserk Village, Hiccup and Fishlegs meet the other fiancés of Tantrum, one of them being Humongously Hotshot the Hero. All of them are to be fed to "the Beast" later in the evening. Hiccup realizes that the chef of the Berserk Chief is actually his old nemesis Alvin the Treacherous. Hiccup tells Alvin that he can help him escape if he shows him where Camicazi is imprisoned. Alvin agrees; however, while they are in the woods, he pushes Hiccup into a tree cell, where Hiccup meets a witch named Hogtrude. The witch gives Hiccup a challenge: she will tell him a story and at the end, they will both guess each other's names. Whoever guesses right will get to kill the other. Both of them guess correctly. Hiccup escapes, rescues Camicazi, and they return to the Berserk Village. 

Hiccup goes back into his cage just as the feeding of "the Beast" begins. Hiccup realizes that "the Beast" is actually Furious. Hiccup frees Furious and together, they free the thirteen fiancés. Furious sets fire to the Berserk woods and tells Hiccup that a year after he leaves the Archipelago, he shall return to destroy the humans along with a dragon army. Hiccup, Camicazi, Fishlegs, Toothless, and their dragons return to Berk along with the honey. Humongous bring his five pots of honey to UG's room and goes on his honeymoon with Tantrum.

 How to Steal a Dragon's Sword (2011) 
Hiccup and other young warriors are brought to the island where "Flashburn's School of Swordfighting" waits for them. The children have 3 weeks at the school to train their sword fighting for New Year's Day. Once at the school, the only person there is the wicked witch Excellinor. She tells everyone that the dragons are revolting in a "Red Rage" and are led by the dragon Furious, who Hiccup released one year before. She tells the tribes that the sword fighting competition must be used to find the next king of the Wilderwest, who, according to prophecy has a dragon with no teeth, an arrow from a land that does not exist, Grimbeard's second-best sword, a ticking-thing, a rectangular shield, a throne, a crown, and the Dragon Jewel. Throughout his previous adventures, Hiccup has collected all of these things, except the throne, the crown, and the dragon jewel.  

Hiccup finds the crown under Flashburn's school, guarded by an ancient dragon called the Wodensfang. Hiccup is declared winner until Snotlout throws a stone at his head, knocking Hiccup's helmet off and revealing his the Slavemark. Since Hiccup is a slave, he is disqualified from the competition and exiled from his tribe. Alvin is declared the new king and declares war on the dragons. Furious arrives and the war begins. Only Windwalker and Toothless stay faithful and bring Hiccup to safety. Hiccup discovers he has the map to find the Dragon Jewel and triumphantly cries: "This is not the end! I will be back!"

 How to Seize a Dragon's Jewel (2012) 
The book starts with Hiccup in exile. He is nearly killed by his mother, Vallhallarama, while he deactivates dragon traps, and loses the map to her. He travels to a slave jail under Alvin the Treacherous's control to spy on Alvin, where he finds his father looking for the Dragon Jewel. A three-headed Deadly Shadow swoops down and snatches Hiccup before he has a chance to look for the Jewel. The dragon brings him to a hill to kill him, but notices that he has the lobster claw necklace.  The dragon tells him that they had promised to care for a Fishlegs when he was a baby. Hiccup tells them of Fishlegs' fate: to be sucked into a hole in the ground. 

Hiccup goes to the hole and gets pulled in by a dragon with an eye on each finger. Hiccup vanquishes the dragon and ventures off into the creature's maze of glass walls, where he finds Fishlegs and the Dragon Jewel. Then they swim to shore through and exit, and the Deadly Shadow picks them up, all flying triumphantly into the distance. Valhallarama finds Hiccup and takes him to the slave jail, where she convinces the slaves to join Hiccup. The Dragons break into the jail and the humans flee. When Hiccup frees Toothless and the Wodensfang, he loses the Dragon Jewel to Alvin. The story ends with Hiccup happily being reunited with his human companions.

 How to Betray a Dragon's Hero (2013) 
Ug the Uglithug tries to trick the Druid Guardian into crowning him king, but the Dragon Guardians of Tomorrow kill him by "Airy Oblivion". Hiccup and his friends hear a human calling for help, then abruptly stopping. They find Snotlout, with Wolf-fangs in the river and thousands of Dragon Rebellion dragons sleeping on the riverbank. Hiccup persuades the rest of the group to save him, accidentally waking up Snotlout's Hogfly and the nearby Rebellion dragons. They all flee to their secret hideout, hiding as Furious and the dragons search for them. 

Alvin's Spydragons kidnap Camicazi, so Snotlout brings them on a rescue mission to save her. After following Snotlout up through a trapdoor, Hiccup discovers that he has betrayed him. After escaping from the witch and Alvin, Camicazi tricks the camp into thinking they are under attack by a large army. Snotlout, who the whole room of Alvinsmen and Dragonmarker prisoners of war had turned turned their backs' on him, repents and frees the prisoners. Hiccup and Snotlout manage to escape into the open ocean with the boat with the ten lost things, but are being chased by Alvin and the witch on dragonback. Snotlout puts on Hiccups clothes and helmet and rides on Hiccup's dragon to face them, but is shot down and killed. Hiccup's lament forgives him for his bullying and praises his later work as a strong young Viking and then Hiccup's boat sinks and he is swept into a storm.

 How to Fight a Dragon's Fury (2015) 
Hiccup wakes up on the beach at Hero's End with amnesia, sustained when he hit his head at the end of the previous book. As the Wodensfang tries to explain who Hiccup is, they are attacked by Sandsharks and a Vampire Spydragon who was tracking him by his two teeth that were in Hiccup's arm after it had bit him the day before.  After defeating the dragons, Hiccup takes a boat which has washed up on the beach and sails towards Tomorrow. 

Once Hiccup reaches Tomorrow, he makes his way to Grimbeard the Ghastly's castle just as Alvin is about to be crowned king by the Druid Guardian. Hiccup regains his memory and convinces the Druid Guardian, with the help of Fishlegs, to crown him king instead. Hiccup is crowned and prepares to engage Furious in single combat. Hiccup rides the Windwalker into battle and Furious knocks him off the Windwalker's back.  Hiccup threatens Furious with the Dragon Jewel. They reach a peace agreement and Hiccup throws the jewel into the sea. 

Alvin and the Witch attack Furious, violating the laws of single combat. Furious gets the dragon army to attack and so soon there is an all-out Vikings vs. Dragons battle. Alvin reveals that he is Fishlegs' father. He prepares to kill Fishlegs before the Dragon Guardians intervene. In battle, the Witch attacks Hiccup with a poisoned Stormblade. Furious takes the blow for Hiccup and kills the Witch. Furious leaves his command of the dragons to Luna, his second-in-command, and goes out to sea to die.  

The epilogue shows how Hiccup built a new kingdom of harmony on Tomorrow where humans and dragons could live in peace. Hiccup instructs Fishlegs to tell everyone that the whole story was just a myth. The series ends the way it began: "There were dragons when I was a boy..."

 In other media 

 DreamWorks franchise 

On 26 March 2010, DreamWorks Animation released a computer-animated film adaptation, titled How to Train Your Dragon. It features Jay Baruchel as Hiccup, Gerard Butler as Stoick the Vast, Hiccup's father, and Craig Ferguson as Gobber the Belch, alongside characters from the books and original characters created for the film. The film was a critical and commercial success, and subsequently became a major media franchise for DreamWorks, including two feature film sequels—How to Train Your Dragon 2 (2014) and How to Train Your Dragon: The Hidden World (2019).

 Audio adaptations 
All twelve novels have been recorded as audio-books and released by Hachette Audio, narrated by actor David Tennant, who also plays the voice of Spitelout, Snotlout's father, in the film adaptations and in the series DreamWorks Dragons. Audio-books of the novels have also been released in German, narrated by Benedikt Weber and released by Arena Verlag GmbH, and are currently available through Audible.com.How to be a Viking'' was recorded and released by Hachette Audio in 2014, narrated by Cressida Cowell.

See also 

 How to Train Your Dragon (franchise)
 How to Train Your Dragon (film)

References

External links 
 

How to Train Your Dragon
Book series introduced in 2003
2003 British novels
British children's novels
Children's fantasy novels
Series of children's books
Hodder & Stoughton books
British novels adapted into films
2003 children's books
Novels set in the Viking Age